Islam was the first Abrahamic monotheistic religion to arrive in Ghana. Today, it is the second most widely professed religion in the country behind Christianity. Its presence in Ghana dates back to the 10th century. According to the Ghana Statistical Service's Population and Housing census (2021), the percentage of Muslims in Ghana is about 19.9%.

According to a 2020 report by Association of Religion Data Archives, 63.5 of Muslims in Ghana are followers of Sunni Islam. The Maliki school of jurisprudence is the most common, though Afa Ajura's reformist activities in the 1960s saw a rise in popularity of the Hanbali school, particularly as informed by the Salafi movement. Sufism, once widespread, has waned considerably over the years; the Tijaniyyah and the Qadiriyyah Sufi orders, however, are still represented among Ghana's traditionalist Muslims.

Muslims and Christians in Ghana have had excellent relations. Guided by the authority of the Muslim Representative Council, religious, social, and economic matters affecting Muslims have often been redressed through negotiations. The National Hajj Council observes the responsibility of arranging pilgrimages to Mecca for believers who can afford the journey. The National Chief Imam of Ghana is the highest authority on Muslim affairs in Ghana.

Some metropolitan areas and cities, especially in areas with a significant Muslim population, have Islamic or Arabic schools offering primary, junior secondary, senior secondary and tertiary education.

History of Islam in Ghana
Islam was introduced by traders from the Sahel regions of West Africa. Prior to that, Da'wah workers had made contact and written extensively about the people including inhabitants of Bonoman states located in the hinterlands of contemporary Ghana.
The introduction of Islam into Ghana was mainly the result of the commercial activities of Mande and Hausa Speaking traders.

Spread of Islam in Ghana
Islam spread through several pathways; the Mande came through the north and north-western corridors of Ghana while the Borno and Hausa traders came from the north-east. Islam is thought to have successfully penetrated southern Ghana following the "collapse of the Bono and the Begho states, and its increase was encouraged by the fact that the slave trade became more lucrative and competitive". Furthermore, the British colonial administration in the nineteenth century enlisted people from various northern predominantly Muslim communities into the colonial army. Finally, the mass exodus of immigrants into forest areas of Ghana following the 1892 Sack of Salaga by joint incursion by Dagomba, Namumba and Gonja tribes depleted Muslim populations in the north while boosting that of the south.

Population of Muslims in Ghana

 
Muslim population is concentrated in northern Ghana and in zongo communities scattered across the country. Zongo communities are settlements predominated by immigrants from Sahelian areas of West Africa (Mandinka, Soninke, Hausa, Songhai, Fulani, etc.) who have adopted Hausa language as a lingua franca. Members of the Zongo community are mistakenly but commonly regarded as Northerners. However, the two communities are distinct, having different cultures and languages.

The official Ghana Statistical Service census reports approximately 20% as being Muslims although that figure is being protested by independent organizations. The Coalition of Muslim Organizations maintain that the final figures released in 2002 "contained serious flaws and as a result could not be used as reliable data for planning and projecting the country’s development agenda". The call came at the same time groups mainly from the North petitioned the government to withdraw the results, expressing concern that some ethnic groups were underrepresented in the population count and that the service should open up their procedures for public scrutiny. CIA statistics put the population of Muslims in Ghana at 17.6 percent. Other accounts place the figure at 25 percent. The government of Ghana's allocation of funds for national development is heavily influenced by population demographics.

Geographical distribution 
According to the 2017 Census, Muslims constitute about 18 percent of the population of Ghana. 

Muslims constitute a majority in Northern Region, the biggest religion in Upper East Region and a large minority Upper West Region. There a slightly less Muslims in the southern parts of Ghana.

Sub groups

Ahmadiyya

The Ahmadiyya Muslim Jama'at was formally established in 1921. By 1957, it had attracted about 100,000 converts, mostly from Christian backgrounds. The first Ahmadi missionary to Ghana, Maulvi Abdul Rahim Nayyar, came upon invitation from Muslims in Saltpond. According to the Pew "The World's Muslims" survey, 16% of Ghanaian respondents indicated that they identify with the Ahmadiyya movement.

Sunni

Islam reached the kingdom of Ghana during the ninth and tenth centuries, during a period of trade and competition with the Berbers of North Africa, who had adopted Sunni Islam, according to the Maliki rite of jurisprudence. By the 14th century, Ghanaian kingdoms featured mosques and palaces, as well as Arabic-style Muslim poetry.

Contemporary Sunnism in Ghana includes a majority that follows the Maliki school, which is predominant in West and North Africa, as well as a large contingent that follows the Hanbali school as interpreted by the Salafi movement.

The Sufi orders have a historic presence in Ghana and, as with much of West Africa, the predominant orders are the Tijaniyya and the Qadiriyya. Sufism is common among the immigrant Muslim population of Ghana, also known as the Zongos. About 37 percent of Muslims in Ghana say they belong to a Sufi order.

Salafism was introduced into Ghana as part of the 1940s reformist activities of the late Ghanaian imam Afa Ajura. Ajura's campaign challenged the mainstream of Ghanaian Sunnism, which followed the Maliki school of jurisprudence and the Ash'ari school of theology. It was not until the 1970s that his movement gained popularity. From the onset of Ajura's mission, Salafism has been primarily propagated across Ghana in his native Dagbanli language. Recently Salafis in Zongo communities in southern Ghana (18% of Muslims) have formed the "Ahlusunnah wal Jamaa" (ASWaJ) organization in order to reach the Hausa-speaking population. ASWaJ still draws inspiration from their parent Anbariyya leadership, headed by Afa Seidu in Tamale.

Shia

Shia Islam is also present in Ghana, primarily among the Lebanese immigrant community that arrived starting in the 1980s. 8% of percent of Ghana's Muslim population identify as Shi'i. Shias freely operate religious schools and mosques.

Other denominations
 Non-denominational

Notable Muslims
Afa Ajura
Aliu Mahama
Sheikh Osman Nuhu Shaributu
Mahamudu Bawumia
Samira Bawumia
Abedi Pele
Farouk Aliu Mahama
Mustapha Abdul-Hamid
Sulley Muntari
Abdul Salam Mumuni
Mubarak Wakaso
André Ayew
Jordan Ayew
Baba Rahman
Kasim Nuhu
Kasim
Mubarak Mohammed Muntaka
Haruna Iddrisu
Mohammed Kudus
Ahmed Ramadan

See also
 Office of Chief Imam of Ghana

 Religion in Ghana

Notes

References

Further reading
 Hanson, John H. The Ahmadiyya in the Gold Coast: Muslim Cosmopolitans in the British Empire (Indiana University Press, 2017).
 Ryan, Patrick J. "Islam in Ghana: its major influences and the situation today." Orita: Ibadan Journal of Religious Studies 28.1-2 (1996): 70–84.
 Skinner, David E. "Conversion to Islam and the promotion of ‘Modern’Islamic Schools in Ghana." Journal of religion in Africa 43.4 (2013): 426–450.
 Weiss, Holger. "Variations in the colonial representation of Islam and Muslims in Northern Ghana, Ca. 1900–1930." Journal of Muslim Minority Affairs 25.1 (2005): 73–95.
 Wilks, Ivor. "The growth of Islamic learning in Ghana." Journal of the Historical Society of Nigeria 2.4 (1963): 409–417. online

External links
 Muslims cry foul over population figures. Amon Salo. Feb 2002
 International Religious Freedom Report Ghana 2006. US Bureau of Democracy, Human Rights and Labor

 
Ghana